Mukemmel "Mike" Sarimsakci (born 1967) is a Turkish-born businessman and primary developer of Dallas, Texas's 211 North Ervay and Butler Brothers Building. Sarimsakci is a principal of Alto / Alterra.

References

Turkish businesspeople
1967 births
Living people